Sturgeon River is an unorganized territory in Saint Louis County, Minnesota, United States. The population was 99 at the 2000 census.

The unincorporated community of Celina is located within Sturgeon River Unorganized Territory.

Geography
According to the United States Census Bureau, the unorganized territory has a total area of 35.9 square miles (93.0 km2), all land.

Demographics
At the 2000 census there were 99 people, 44 households, and 26 families living in the unorganized territory. The population density was 2.8 people per square mile (1.1/km2). There were 85 housing units at an average density of 2.4/sq mi (0.9/km2).  The racial makeup of the unorganized territory was 91.92% White, 1.01% Native American, and 7.07% from two or more races.
Of the 44 households 25.0% had children under the age of 18 living with them, 59.1% were married couples living together, and 40.9% were non-families. 36.4% of households were one person and 11.4% were one person aged 65 or older. The average household size was 2.25 and the average family size was 3.04.

The age distribution was 23.2% under the age of 18, 1.0% from 18 to 24, 20.2% from 25 to 44, 38.4% from 45 to 64, and 17.2% 65 or older. The median age was 48 years. For every 100 females, there were 110.6 males. For every 100 females age 18 and over, there were 117.1 males.

The median household income was $23,875 and the median family income  was $55,938. Males had a median income of $48,750 versus $32,375 for females. The per capita income for the unorganized territory was $18,659. There were 32.1% of families and 18.9% of the population living below the poverty line, including no under eighteens and 47.4% of those over 64.

References

Populated places in St. Louis County, Minnesota
Unorganized territories in Minnesota